Litosphingia is a genus of moths in the family Sphingidae erected by Karl Jordan in 1920.

Species
Litosphingia corticea Jordan 1920
Litosphingia minettii Cadiou, 2000

References

Sphingini
Moth genera
Taxa named by Karl Jordan